Luis Mariano Almandoz (born 10 January 1994) is an Argentine football.

He has played for clubs like Argentinos Juniors or Chile's Deportes Temuco.

References
 
 
 

1994 births
Living people
Argentine expatriate footballers
Argentine footballers
Club Comunicaciones footballers
Argentinos Juniors footballers
Deportes Temuco footballers
Chilean Primera División players
Argentine Primera División players
Expatriate footballers in Chile
Argentine expatriate sportspeople in Chile
Association football defenders
Sportspeople from Buenos Aires Province